Pfalzgrafenstein Castle is a toll castle on the Falkenau island, otherwise known as Pfalz Island in the River Rhine near Kaub, Germany.  Known as "the Pfalz", this former stronghold is famous for its picturesque and unique setting.

History
The keep of this island castle, a pentagonal tower with its point upstream, was erected between 1326 and 1327 by King Ludwig the Bavarian. Around the tower, a defensive hexagonal wall was built between 1338 and 1340. In 1477 Pfalzgrafenstein was passed as deposit to the Count of Katzenelnbogen. Later additions were made in 1607 and 1755, consisting of corner turrets, the gun bastion pointing upstream, and the characteristic baroque tower cap.

The castle functioned as a toll-collecting station that was not to be ignored. It worked in concert with Gutenfels Castle and the fortified town of Kaub on the right side of the river. Due to a dangerous cataract on the river's left, about a kilometer upstream, every vessel would have to use the fairway nearer to the right bank, thus floating downstream between the mighty fortress on the vessel's left and the town and castle on its right. A chain across the river drawn between those two fortifications forced ships to submit, and uncooperative traders could be kept in the dungeon until a ransom was delivered. The dungeon was a wooden float in the well.

Unlike the vast majority of Rhine castles, "the Pfalz" was never conquered or destroyed, withstanding not only wars, but also the natural onslaughts of ice and floods by the river. Its spartan quarters held about twenty men.

Extensive measures of waterway engineering in the nineteenth century, above all straightening the river for better use as an international waterway and along this particular stretch, clearing it from the old cataract, relocated the regularly used fairway from the river's right arm to its left. Thus the tactical advantage may not be apparent to one unaware of the change in the watercourse.

The island of the castle was used for the Rhine crossing by 60,000 Prussian troops under Blücher in the winter of 1814 in his pursuit of Napoleon.

The castle was acquired by Prussia in 1866, and toll collections ceased in 1867. It continued to be used as a signal station for the river boat traffic for about another century. In 1946, the castle became the property of the State of Rhineland-Palatinate.

Museum
The State eventually turned "the Pfalz" into a museum and restored the color scheme of the baroque period. The museum reflects the conditions of the 14th century, and the visitor will not find modern amenities such as electricity or a lavatory. It is accessible to the public via a ferry service from nearby Kaub as long as river conditions permit.

The area is part of the Rhine Gorge, a World Heritage Site.

Notes and references

External links

 History (German)
 Burg Pfalzgrafenstein – Tollstation at Kaub
 Aerial views of Pfalzgrafenstein castle
 History (English)

Buildings and structures completed in 1340
Pfalzgrafenstein
Landmarks in Germany
Museums in Rhineland-Palatinate
Historic house museums in Germany
Electoral Palatinate
Toll castles